Tom Clancy's Jack Ryan (also known simply as Jack Ryan) is an American political action thriller television series, based on characters from the fictional "Ryanverse" created by Tom Clancy, that premiered on August 31, 2018, on Amazon Prime Video. The series was created by Carlton Cuse and Graham Roland. Cuse serves as an executive producer alongside John Krasinski, Michael Bay, and Mace Neufeld, among others. Krasinski also stars in the series as the title character, making him the fifth actor to portray the character after Alec Baldwin, Harrison Ford, Ben Affleck, and Chris Pine from the film series.

In April 2018, Amazon renewed the series for a second season which premiered on October 31, 2019. In February 2019, Amazon renewed the series for a third season, which premiered on December 21, 2022. Ahead of the third season, Amazon renewed the series for a fourth season. In May 2022, before the release of the third season, it was confirmed the series would end after four seasons, possibly aiming for a 2023 date. A spin-off starring Michael Peña as Ding Chavez is in development.

Premise
The first season follows the titular CIA analyst as he is wrenched from the security of his desk job into the field after discovering a string of dubious bank transfers, which are being carried out by a rising Islamic extremist named Suleiman.

The second season sees Jack in the middle of political warfare in a corrupt Venezuela.

In the third season, Jack investigates a plot to recreate the former Soviet Union by detonating an untraceable tactical nuclear bomb in a former Soviet country.

Cast and characters

Main
 John Krasinski as Dr. Jack Ryan, a former Marine officer and Afghanistan veteran working as a financial analyst for the Central Intelligence Agency (CIA), specifically the Terror Finance and Arms Division (T-FAD) under the Counterterrorism Center (CTC); later promoted to head of T-FAD. In season 3, Jack is working in the field as a CIA operations officer.
 Krasinski's interpretation of the character is said to be inspired by Harrison Ford's portrayal in Patriot Games and Clear and Present Danger. Director and executive producer Daniel Sackheim said: "What was so great about the Harrison Ford movies was that they were about an everyman hero. He was a guy who wasn't a superhero. He was heroic, but he was vulnerable. He wasn't afraid to be scared. He was a regular man and a hero."
 Wendell Pierce as James Greer, Ryan's boss in T-FAD, a non-practicing Muslim and former CIA station chief in Karachi; later promoted to deputy station chief in Moscow, and now re-assigned to Venezuela by request.
 Abbie Cornish as Dr. Cathy Mueller (season 1), a physician specializing in infectious diseases, and Ryan's love interest.
 Ali Suliman as Mousa bin Suleiman (season 1), a Lebanese-born French Islamic terrorist skilled in finance, radicalized after graduating from Dauphine, seeking to establish a unified Islamic caliphate against the West with his brother Ali.
 Dina Shihabi as Hanin Ali (season 1), Suleiman's wife.
 John Hoogenakker as Matice (aka "Garth" and Jeff, season 2, recurring season 1), a leading black ops operative with the CIA Special Activities Center
 Noomi Rapace as Harriet "Harry" Baumann (season 2), a German Federal Intelligence Service (BND) agent tracking her former associate Max Schenkel in Venezuela.
 Jordi Mollà as Nicolás Reyes (season 2), president of Venezuela.
 Francisco Denis as Miguel Ubarri (season 2), President Reyes's chief advisor and childhood friend, a concerned general.
 Cristina Umaña as Gloria Bonalde (season 2), the major contender in the upcoming Venezuelan presidential election and wife of the missing Minister of Interior and Justice.
 Jovan Adepo as Marcus Bishop (season 2), a retired U.S. Navy special crewman now fixing boats, reluctantly recruited back into action with call sign "Uber (Select)".
 Michael Kelly as Mike November (seasons 2–3), CIA station chief in Venezuela, twice divorced from U.S. Ambassador to Venezuela Lisa Calabrese.
 Betty Gabriel as Elizabeth Wright (season 3).
 James Cosmo as Luka Goncharov (season 3).
 Peter Guinness as Petr Kovac (season 3).
 Nina Hoss as Alena Kovac (season 3).
 Alexej Manvelov as Alexei Petrov (season 3).
 Michael Peña (season 4) as Domingo "Ding" Chavez.

Recurring

 Karim Zein as Samir (season 1), Suleiman and Hanin's son.
 Nadia Affolter as Sara (season 1), Suleiman and Hanin's elder daughter.
 Arpy Ayvazian as Rama (season 1), Suleiman and Hanin's younger daughter.
 Haaz Sleiman as Ali bin Suleiman (season 1), Suleiman's younger brother.
 Amir El-Masry as Ibrahim (season 1), the most trusted member of Suleiman's sect.
 Goran Kostić as Ansore Dudayev (season 1).
 Timothy Hutton as Nathan Singer (season 1), CIA Deputy Director of Operations.
 Adam Bernett as Patrick Klinghoffer (season 1), Ryan's colleague in T-FAD.
 Eileen Li as Noreen Yang (season 1), Ryan's colleague.
 Mena Massoud as Tarek Kassar (season 1), Ryan's colleague.
 Zarif Kabier as Jabir (season 1).
 Kamel Labroudi as Yazid (season 1).
 Shadi Janho as Amer (season 1).
 Victoria Sanchez as Layla Navarro (season 1), Ryan's colleague.
 Matt McCoy as Dr. Daniel Nadler (season 1), leader of the contingent of hostage physicians from Doctors Without Borders
 Marie-Josée Croze as Sandrine Arnaud (season 1), a French intelligence officer.
 John Magaro as 1st Lt Victor Polizzi (season 1), a U.S. Air Force MQ-9 Reaper sensor operator.
 Daniel Kash as Shelby Farnsworth (season 1), CIA Director of Operations.
 Jameel Khoury as Colonel Al Radwan (season 1).
 Kenny Wong as Danny (season 1), Singer's aide.
 Emmanuelle Lussier-Martinez as Teresa (season 1), Ryan's colleague.
 Al Sapienza as Lt. Gen. Marcus Trent (season 1), Secretary of Defense.
 Chadi Alhelou as Fathi (season 1), Hanin's uncle.
 Stephane Krau as Lt. Bruno Cluzet (season 1).
 Susan Misner as US Ambassador to Venezuela Lisa Calabrese (season 2).
 Tom Wlaschiha as Max Schenkel (season 2), a contract killer, former German special forces and BND officer.
 Allan Hawco as Coyote (season 2).
 Arnold Vosloo as Jost Van Der Byl (season 2), a South African arms trafficker.
 Mikhail Safronov as Surikov (season 3), President of Russia.
 Adam Vacula as Radek Breza (season 3), President Kovac's bodyguard.
 Anton Pampushnyy as Konstantin Vyatkin (season 3), GRU agent.

Guest

 Victor Slezak as Joe Mueller, Cathy's father (season 1).
 Jenny Raven as Dr. Yen (season 1).
 Cynthia Preston as Blanche Dubois (season 1).
 Lee Tergesen as Stanley Kowalski (season 1).
 Yani Marin as Ava Garcia (season 1), Victor's drone pilot partner.
 Jonathan Bailey as Lance Miller (season 1).
 Natalie Brown as Rebecca (season 1).
 Blair Brown as Sue Joyce (season 1), Director of the CIA.
 Ron Canada as Bobby Vig (season 1), Director of National Intelligence.
 Michael Gaston as U.S. President Andrew Pickett (season 1).
 Julianne Jain as Marabel (season 1).
 Youness Benzakour as Ismail Ahmadi (season 1).
 John Robinson as Buster (season 1).
 Numan Acar as Tony (seasons 1, 3).
 Conrad Coates as Colonel Robert Phelps (season 1).
 Karen LeBlanc as Kalie Horn (season 1).
 Jonathan Potts as Dr. Roger Wade (season 1).
 Benito Martinez as Senator Jim Moreno (season 2).
 Frank Whaley as Carter Estes (season 2).
 William Jackson Harper as Xander (season 2), a CIA computer specialist.

Episodes

Season 1 (2018)

Season 2 (2019)

Season 3 (2022)

Production

Development
On September 22, 2015, it was announced that Carlton Cuse and Graham Roland were developing a television series adaptation of Tom Clancy's Jack Ryan series of novels. 
The potential series was described as "a new contemporary take on the character using the novels as source material". Production companies involved with the project were slated to include Paramount Television, Platinum Dunes and Skydance Media. A week later, following a bidding war among multiple television networks, it was announced that streaming service Amazon Video had purchased the rights to the series.

Amazon proceeded to put the production into development during which time they ordered three scripts written by Cuse and Roland. On August 16, 2016, it was announced that the production had been given a straight-to-series order for a first season consisting of ten episodes.

In January 2017, it was announced that Morten Tyldum would direct the pilot and that Daniel Sackheim would direct multiple episodes and produce the series.

On April 24, 2018, it was reported that Amazon had renewed the series. The second season was set in South America, where Ryan takes on "a dangerous, declining democratic regime." On May 14, 2018, it was reported that Richard Rutkowski had served as cinematographer for the pilot and that Checco Varese had acted in the role for the following seven episodes of season one.

On August 14, 2018, it was announced that Phil Abraham was joining the series as an executive producer and would direct the first two episodes of the second season.

On September 4, 2018, it was reported that Dennie Gordon would direct three episodes of season two and serve as an executive producer.

On February 13, 2019, Amazon renewed the series for a third season at the TCA press tour which is scheduled to be released on December 21, 2022.

On October 24, 2019, Paul Scheuring was reported to be the showrunner for season three, as well as an executive producer. Scheuring stepped down as showrunner in January 2020 "after discovering he wasn't a good fit". He was replaced by Vaun Wilmott, a writer and producer on Star Trek: Discovery. On October 14, 2021, before the third season release, Amazon renewed the series for a fourth season. On May 9, 2022, before the release of the third season, it was confirmed the series would end after four seasons. A spin-off revolving around Peña's character was also announced to be in development.

Casting
On April 29, 2016, it was announced that John Krasinski had been cast in the series' title role. On November 3, 2016, it was reported that Abbie Cornish had been cast as Ryan's love interest Cathy Mueller. On December 16, 2016, it was announced that Wendell Pierce, Ali Suliman, and Dina Shihabi had been cast in series regular roles. In March 2017, it was announced that Peter Fonda, Mena Massoud, Timothy Hutton, and Al Sapienza had been cast in recurring roles. On June 5, 2017, it was reported that Amir El-Masry had joined the series in a supporting role.

Alongside the announcement of the series' renewal, it was confirmed that Krasinski and Pierce would return for the second season. On May 4, 2018, it was reported John Hoogenakker had been promoted to a series regular for season two after previously appearing in season one in a recurring capacity. On July 20, 2018, it was announced during Amazon's San Diego Comic-Con panel that Noomi Rapace had joined the main cast for season two. In August 2018, it was announced that Michael Kelly, Jovan Adepo, Jordi Molla, Cristina Umaña, and Francisco Denis had joined the cast of season two as series regulars. On September 25, 2018, it was reported that Tom Wlaschiha had been cast in a recurring role for season two. Upon the series' fourth season renewal announcement, Michael Peña joined the cast in an undisclosed role for the fourth season. On October 18, 2021, it was reported that Cornish will reprise her role as Dr. Cathy Mueller for the fourth season.

Filming
Jack Ryan was filmed in multiple locations. On May 10, 2017, Krasinski was spotted filming his scenes in Washington, D.C. For the next several days the TV series was also shot in Maryland, Virginia, Quebec, London, and Morocco. Some scenes were shot in Paris and Chamonix, France.

The first season features approximately 1,000 visual effects shots, including the opening bombing run in the pilot episode.

Production for season two began in mid-2018 in Europe, South America, and the United States. Shooting locations included Bogotá, Colombia (standing in for Venezuela), London, Moscow and New York.

Production on the third season of Jack Ryan began in May 2021, with locations including Prague, Czech Republic. Season 3 was released on Prime Video in December 2022.

Production for season four began in February 2022, with locations including Dubrovnik, Croatia.

Release

Premiere
On June 16, 2018, the series held its world premiere at the 58th Annual Monte-Carlo Television Festival at the Grimaldi Forum in Monte Carlo, Monaco. The event included a screening of the series' pilot episode that was attended by cast members John Krasinski, Dina Shihabi and Wendell Pierce, alongside series creators, showrunners and executive producers Carlton Cuse and Graham Roland.

Home media
Paramount Home Media Distribution released Blu-ray and DVD disc editions of the first season of Jack Ryan on June 4, 2019. The Blu-ray edition includes deleted scenes and Dolby Atmos surround soundtrack not available when viewing through Amazon Prime.

Reception

On Rotten Tomatoes it received an overall score of 75%, and an overall score of 65 on Metacritic.

Season 1
The series premiered to a positive critical response. On the review aggregation website Rotten Tomatoes, the first season holds an approval rating of 75% with an average rating of 6.4 out of 10, based on 85 reviews. The site's critical consensus reads: "Though not as thematically rich as some of its geopolitical predecessors, Jack Ryan is a satisfying addition to the genre buoyed by exceptional action sequences and a likable cast." Metacritic, which uses a weighted average, assigned the season a score of 66 out of 100 based on 28 critics, indicating "generally favorable reviews".

In a positive review, RogerEbert.coms Nick Allen praised the series saying, "Expertly plotted by creators Carlton Cuse and Graham Roland, Tom Clancy's Jack Ryan is all the more impactful for its restraint and scope, offering excellent character-based drama that's concerned with much more than just its namesake." Similarly favorable, The Gazettes Terry Terrones awarded the series a grade of "A−" and directed specific approval towards Krasinski's performance saying, "This version of Jack Ryan is relatable, but also admirable because the actor portraying him can balance so many aspects of the character with ease. Krasinski plays him so naturally I couldn't tell where he ended and Ryan began." In another enthusiastic appraisal, Rolling Stones Alan Sepinwall accorded the series three and a half stars out of five and complimented it saying, "Like Jack Ryan himself, the Amazon show is smart and confident and thorough. That's enough to get the job done."

In a more mixed assessment, TVLines Dave Nemetz gave the series a grade of "C+" and offered the series restrained commendation saying, "Amazon's awkwardly titled Tom Clancy's Jack Ryan is at its best when things are exploding, delivering a number of impressively high-octane action sequences on a scale rarely seen on television. The rest of the series, though, is disappointingly mediocre ... and its choice of leading man may be a major stumbling block." In a negative critique, Vanity Fairs Sonia Saraiya chastised the show saying "Tom Clancy's Jack Ryan is hysterical. Hysterical as in histrionic; hysterical as in somehow funny; hysterical as in you wish its team had worked harder to take the temperature of the world around us before sending this highly charged and obscenely blinkered James Bond manqué into the world." Equally dismissive, Pastes Amy Amatangelo criticized the series saying, "But more often than not, the show plods along with no real sense of urgency. I often had to restrain myself from scrolling through my phone. I was that bored while I was watching. Those indoctrinated into the Jack Ryan canon via the books or the movies will find the eight-episode series is faithful to the spirit of all that preceded it. I'm just not sure we needed it at all."

The series has been criticized for a scene in the episode "Black 22" in which a character uses the word tranny. LGBT activist Eliel Cruz alleged that the scene treats a major cause of violence against trans women as "a throwaway joke." Similarly, the series has also received criticism in French publications for its depiction of the country, specifically in the episodes "French Connection" and "Black 22", where various scenes have been condemned. Stéphanie Guerrin of Le Parisien expressed her concern for the dialogue spoken by and about the French saying, "This series of dangerously caricatural comments leaves one wondering." Le Points Bastien Haugel specifically took grievance, in an otherwise positive review, with the portrayal of a French policeman who espoused anti-Muslim views calling it "dangerously caricatural".

Season 2
Previews of season two, in which Ryan ends up on a mission to Venezuela to "bring stability to a country on the brink of collapse", has been criticized by the government of Venezuela for allegedly promoting an invasion of the country by the United States. Venezuela's Minister of Cultural Affairs, Ernesto Villegas, described previews of the show as "Crass war propaganda disguised as entertainment". Venezuelan actor Francisco Denis, who plays Ubarri, a senior Venezuelan government official in the new season, responded to his government's criticism by highlighting the fictional character of the series. "I don't think the CIA needs [a show like] this to intervene or not in a country," he said. Denis did regret that the series has included mistakes such as the fictitious meeting of the Venezuelan president with the CIA—which, in his opinion, would never occur under the current administrations—or presenting the most powerful man in the country as "basking in luxury".

On Rotten Tomatoes, the season holds an approval rating of 67% based on 27 reviews, with an average rating of 6.7 out of 10. The site's critics consensus reads: "Jack Ryans second season is both more refined and more predictable, doubling down on its espionage set-pieces while toning down its titular character's moral complexities to create a more straight-forward spy show." Metacritic, based upon 6 critics, assigned the season a score of 56 out of 100, indicating "mixed or average reviews".

Tim Goodman of The Hollywood Reporter gave a favorable review: "Jack Ryan is still fun, despite being a little bit ridiculous and predictable ... Not all the events described above make perfect sense and there's definitely some bloat here storytelling-wise, but that never seems to cut into the pacing. It's a strong, appealing cast and an entertaining story — the same successful formula as the first season and a welcome return visitor to the living room".

Season 3
On Rotten Tomatoes, the third season holds an approval rating of 85% based on 20 reviews, with an average rating of 7 out of 10. The site's critics consensus reads: "Leaning harder than ever on John Krasinski's earthy charisma, Jack Ryan gets the job done with a third season that doesn't reinvent the formula but executes it with the utmost efficiency." Metacritic, based upon 4 critics, assigned the season a score of 73 out of 100, indicating "generally favorable reviews".

Awards and nominations

References

External links
 
 

2018 American television series debuts
2010s American drama television series
2010s American political television series
2020s American drama television series
2020s American political television series
American action television series
American political drama television series
American spy thriller television series
English-language television shows
Political thriller television series
Amazon Prime Video original programming
Ryanverse
Television series about the Central Intelligence Agency
Television series by Amazon Studios
Television series by Paramount Television
Television series by Skydance Television
Television series created by Carlton Cuse
Television shows based on American novels
Television shows filmed in Montreal
Television shows set in London
Television shows set in Morocco
Television shows set in Paris
Television shows set in Turkey
Television shows set in Venezuela
Television shows set in Virginia
Television shows set in Moscow
Television shows set in Rome
Television shows set in Athens
Television shows set in Austria
Terrorism in television